Duckbill may refer to:

 Platypus, Ornithorhynchus anatinus
 Duckbill dinosaurs, family Hadrosauridae
 Duckbill fishes, family Percophidae
 Duckbill eels, family Nettastomatidae
 Duckbill choke, a shotgun accessory
 Duckbill valve, a valve used to prevent back flow
 Duckbill (rock formation), Oregon
 Duckbill mask

See also
 Bird's beak
 Duck

Animal common name disambiguation pages